Photonectes is a genus of fish in the family Stomiidae found in Atlantic, Indian and Pacific Ocean.

Species
There are currently 23 recognized species in this genus:
 Photonectes achirus Regan & Trewavas, 1930
 Photonectes albipennis (Döderlein (de), 1882) (White-pen dragonfish)
 Photonectes barnetti Klepadlo, 2011 
 Photonectes braueri (Zugmayer, 1913) (Brauer's dragonfish)
 Photonectes caerulescens Regan & Trewavas, 1930 (Bulb-less dragonfish)
 Photonectes coffea Klepadlo, 2011 
 Photonectes cornutus Beebe, 1933 
 Photonectes corynodes Klepadlo, 2011 
 Photonectes dinema Regan & Trewavas, 1930
 Photonectes gorodinskii Prokofiev, 2015 
 Photonectes gracilis Goode & T. H. Bean, 1896 (Graceful dragonfish)
Photonectes klepadloae Prokofiev & Frable, 2021 
 Photonectes leucospilus Regan & Trewavas, 1930
 Photonectes litvinovi Prokofiev, 2014 
 Photonectes margarita (Goode & T. H. Bean, 1896)
 Photonectes mirabilis A. E. Parr, 1927 (Blue-band dragonfish)
 Photonectes munificus Gibbs, 1968
 Photonectes parvimanus Regan & Trewavas, 1930 (Fleshy-fin dragonfish)
 Photonectes paxtoni Flynn & Klepadlo, 2012 
 Photonectes phyllopogon Regan & Trewavas, 1930
 Photonectes uncinatus Prokofiev, 2015 
 Photonectes venetaenia Prokofiev, 2016 
 Photonectes waitti Flynn & Klepadlo, 2012

References

Stomiidae
Bioluminescent fish
Taxa named by Albert Günther
Marine fish genera
Ray-finned fish genera